Land of the Sun is an album by American jazz musician Charlie Haden. In 2005, the album won Haden the Grammy Award for Best Latin Jazz Album.

Reception 

Music critic Thom Jurek of AllMusic wrote of the album; "Land of the Sun is a deeply romantic album, but it is lush without artificial ornamentation or affectation. Musically, its refinement is such that it begs critical as well as casual listening. Hopefully this won't be the last such exercise from Haden and Rubalcaba, but an introduction."

Track listing 
 "Fuiste Tú (It Was You)" (Marroquín, Sabre) – 6:17
 "Sueño Sólo con Tu Amor (I Only Dream of Your Love)" (Marroquín, Sabre) – 5:08
 "Canción de Cuna a Patricia (Lullaby for Patricia)" (Marroquín) – 7:00
 "Solamente una Vez (You Belong to My Heart)" (Lara) – 8:06
 "Nostalgia" (Marroquín) – 5:40
 "De Siempre (Forever)" (Marroquín) – 7:07
 "Añoranza (Longing)" (Marroquín) – 3:21
 "Cuando Te Podré Olvidar (When Will I Forget You)" (Marroquín, Sabre) – 4:49
 "Esta Tarde Vi Llover (Yesterday I Heard the Rain)" (Manzanero) – 6:42
 "Canción a Paola (Paola's Song)" (Marroquín) – 8:58

Personnel 
Charlie Haden – bass
Gonzalo Rubalcaba – piano
Ignacio Berroa – drums
Joe Lovano – tenor saxophone
Miguel Zenon – alto saxophone
Michael Rodriquez – trumpet, flugelhorn
Oriente Lopez – flute
Larry Koonse – guitar
Lionel Loueke – guitar
Juan De La Cruz – percussion

Notes 
Recorded December 19–22, 2003 at Avatar Studios, NYC. Mixed February 22–28, 2004 at Capitol Studios, Los Angeles, California. Mastered April 12, 2004 at the Mastering Lab, Los Angeles, California

References 

2004 albums
Charlie Haden albums
Grammy Award for Best Latin Jazz Album